The 13th Biathlon European Championships were held in Langdorf, Germany, from February 28 to March 5, 2006.

There were total of 16 competitions held: sprint, pursuit, individual and relay both for U26 and U21.

Results

U26

Men's

Women's

U21

Men's

Women's

Medal table

External links 
 IBU full results
 All results

Biathlon European Championships
International sports competitions hosted by Germany
2006 in biathlon
2006 in German sport
Sports competitions in Bavaria
Biathlon competitions in Germany